The Kaddare alphabet is a writing script created to transcribe Somali, a Cushitic language in the Afroasiatic language family.

History
The orthography was invented in 1952 by a Sufi Sheikh, named Hussein Sheikh Ahmed Kaddare.

A phonetically robust writing system, the technical commissions that appraised the Kaddare script concurred that it was the most accurate indigenous script and orthography for transcribing the Somali language.

Form

The Kaddare script uses both upper and lower case letters, with the lower case represented in cursive. Many characters are transcribed without having to lift the pen.

Several of Kaddare's letters are similar to those in the Osmanya script, while others bear a resemblance to Brahmi.

As there are no dedicated characters for long vowels, a vowel is made long by simply writing it twice.

See also
Somali orthography
Borama
Osmanya

References

Further reading

External links
Somali Language History and Vernaculars
The report of the Somali Language Committee

Writing systems of Africa
Somali language
Somali orthography